Karakulevo (Qarakül) is a rural locality (a village) in Ariyevsky Selsoviet, Duvansky District, Bashkortostan, Russia. The population was 357 as of 2010. There are 6 streets.

Geography 
Karakulevo is located 7 km northwest of Mesyagutovo (the district's administrative centre) by road. Mesyagutovo is the nearest rural locality.

References 

Rural localities in Duvansky District